Pasteles (singular pastel), also pastelles in the English-speaking Caribbean, are a traditional dish in several Latin American and Caribbean countries. In Puerto Rico, the Dominican Republic, Venezuela, Panama, Trinidad and Tobago, and the Caribbean coast of Colombia, the dish looks like a tamal. In Hawaii, they are called pateles in a phonetic rendering of the Puerto Rican pronunciation of pasteles, as discussed below.

Puerto Rican pasteles
Related to alcapurria, tamales, hallacas, and guanimes, pasteles were originally made by the indigenous people of the Caribbean. Tainos made masa from cassava, yautía and squash. The masa was then filled with beans, fruit, chilies, corn, nuts, meat, fish and wrapped in corn husk.

Pasteles can be traced back several centuries to Spanish colonial times, before they became an essential Puerto Rican Christmas dish. In Eating Puerto Rico: A History of Food, Culture, and Identity, Ortíz Cuadra explains that the technique of wrapping the pastel in banana leaves is owed largely to Puerto Ricans’ African ancestors who were enslaved by the Spanish and forced to work the sugar plantations. In the early 19th century, Spanish colonizers provided enslaved African workers a limited diet of viandas, which largely included plantains, a fruit that colonizers and white Puerto Rican elites alike looked down on as “rural y bárbaro.”

In Puerto Rico, pasteles are a cherished culinary recipe, especially around Christmas-time. The masa consists of typically grated green banana, green plantain, white yautía, potato, and tropical pumpkins known as calabazas. It is seasoned with liquid from the meat mixture, milk, and annatto oil. The meat is prepared as a stew and usually contains any combination of boston butt, ham, bacon, raisins, chickpeas, sliced pickled pimiento peppers, olives and capers, and is commonly seasoned with bay leaves, recaito, tomato sauce, adobo seco, and annatto oil, but the seasoning is not limited to these nor are root vegetables. Filling can range from vegetables, poultry, fish, sausage, and game meat. 

Traditionally masa was flavored breadcrumbs and butter, almonds where added to filling and a chili would be tucked on one end of every pastele. The chili in most homes is eliminated and is replaced with ajilimójili, Pique sauce, or ketchup mixed with chili. 

Assembling a typical pastel involves a large sheet of parchment paper, a strip of banana leaf that has been heated over an open flame to make it supple, and a little annatto oil on the leaf. The masa is then placed on banana leaf and stuffed with the meat mixture. The paper is then folded and tied with kitchen string to form packets. Some people use aluminum foil instead of parchment and string. Parchment paper is only applied if the pastele is boiled or steamed. Once made, pasteles can either be cooked in boiling water, steamed, barbecue (smoked or slow grilling), or frozen for later use. Because they are so labor-intensive, large Puerto Rican families often make anywhere from 50 to 200 or more at a time, especially around the holiday season. 

Pasteles de yuca is one of many recipes in Puerto Rico  that are popular around the island and in Latin America. The masa is made with cassava, other root vegetables, plantains, and squash. The recipe calls for cassava to replace the green bananas of the traditional pasteles de masa. Cassava is grated and squeezed through a cheesecloth removing most of its liquid. Broth, milk, butter, annatto oil is added to the masa and is typically filled with shredded chicken and other ingredients.

Other regional variations

Colombia
Colombian pasteles are called pastel de arroz (rice pasteles) and are more of a tamale than a typical pastel. Is made up of rice that is seasoned and left out in the sun; a process referred to as orear (to air). The rice is then mixed with many ingredients. Pickled vegetables, chorizo, pork, chickpeas, olives, and potatoes are the most common. Chicken and beef are also used. Colombian pasteles are wrapped twice, once with a cabbage leaf, and again with a banana leaf.  This is the typical meal of the Nochebuena Dinner (Christmas Eve), in the Caribbean Coast Region of Colombia since their humble beginnings. It is often confused with the tamal from the Andean region, which is made up with corn.

Dominican Republic

Dominican version are filled with ground beef and known as "pasteles de hojas". 

A Dominican cookbook in 1938 is the first to print recipes on pasteles. The cookbook printed two recipes, titled pasteles Puertorriqueño and pasteles Dominicano. The only difference is Dominican pasteles add cassava.

Hawaii
The common name for this food in Hawaii, pateles, is most likely borrowed from Caribbean Spanish, which features weakening or loss of /s/ at the end of syllables: the pronunciation of pasteles as "pateles" occurs in Puerto Rican dialects, for instance. Over 5000 Puerto Ricans migrated to Hawaii at the dawn of the 20th century to work in sugar plantations. The singular of pasteles, pastel (often pronounced patel), has been constructed through back-formation. The usage of the singular can be seen in phrases such as pastele stew, "pot pastele", and "baked pastele".

Trinidad and Tobago

Trinidadian pastelles are small meat-filled cornmeal pies stuffed with meat, fish or vegetables seasoned with fresh herbs and flavored with raisins, olives and capers wrapped and steamed in a banana leaf. They are traditionally prepared and eaten during the Christmas season. It is believed that they were introduced by Spanish colonizers who ruled between the late 15th and early 18th centuries.

They exist in some form or another throughout Latin America and are more commonly known in Venezuela as hallacas (pronounced hayacas).  The origins of pastelles are unclear.  One view is that Spanish colonists who settled in the region made them as a substitute for one of their favorite delicacies – empanada gallega. Empanada gallega and pasteles both have heavily spiced meaty fillings but pastelles are made with cornmeal while the empanada is more like a typical pastry as it is made with white flour. Another view is that the dish, because it uses corn and is wrapped in banana leaves, is a derivative of the mesoamerican tamale.

A sweet version is called paime and is also a Christmas dish. It contains no filling, but the dough itself contains ground coconut and raisins.

See also
 Conkies
 List of maize dishes
 List of stuffed dishes

Notes

References

Christmas food
Latin American cuisine
Dumplings
Colombian cuisine
Puerto Rican cuisine
Hawaiian cuisine
Salvadoran cuisine
Dominican Republic cuisine
Trinidad and Tobago cuisine
Panamanian cuisine
Venezuelan cuisine
Stuffed dishes